Michael or Mike Nichols may refer to:
 Mike Nichols (1931–2014), American film, stage, and television director and producer
 Michael Nichols (photographer) (born 1952), American journalist and photographer
 Mike J. Nichols, American film editor
 Mike Nichols (author) (born 1952), American neo-Pagan leader and author